Crambopsis is a genus of moths of the family Noctuidae.

Species
Crambopsis excludens Walker, 1865

References
Natural History Museum Lepidoptera genus database

Hadeninae